Carl Gustaf Mannerheim may refer to:

 Carl Gustaf Mannerheim (naturalist) (1797–1854), Finnish entomologist and governor
 Carl Gustaf Emil Mannerheim (1867–1951), soldier, statesman, and President of Finland; grandson of the entomologist